Edgewood Lake is an unincorporated community in Greencastle Township, Putnam County, in the U.S. state of Indiana.

History
The community takes its name from nearby Edgewood Lake.

Geography

References

Unincorporated communities in Putnam County, Indiana
Unincorporated communities in Indiana